West Hoxton is a suburb of Sydney, in the state of New South Wales, Australia. West Hoxton is located 40 kilometres west of the Sydney central business district, in the local government area of the City of Liverpool and is part of the Greater Western Sydney region.

History
West Hoxton is an extension of Hoxton Park. Hoxton Park was named in 1887 when Phillips and Co, a syndicate, subdivided the land under that name. Thomas Setrop Amos, a London solicitor, who arrived in Sydney in 1816, was granted  in this area in June 1818.

West Hoxton was primarily developed during the late 1990s as a residential area.

Schools
 Hoxton Park Public School
 Greenway Park Public School
 Thomas Hassall Anglican College
 Clancy Catholic College

Population
In the 2016 census, West Hoxton had a population of 10,012, of which 50.4% were male and 49.6% were female. The median age was 32. The most common ancestries were Italian 11.1%, Australian 10.9%, English 9.0%, Indian 5.6% and Chinese 3.7%. 58.0% of people were born in Australia. The most common other countries of birth were Iraq 4.9%, Fiji 4.6%, Philippines 2.6%, New Zealand 1.6% and Italy 1.6%. 47.2% of people only spoke English at home. Other languages spoken at home included Arabic 7.9%, Hindi 5.1%, Spanish 3.6%, Italian 3.4% and Assyrian Neo-Aramaic 3.0%.

The population of West Hoxton increased more than sixfold from 1996 to 2001, to number 4,997, as a result of residential development. Between 2001 and 2016, it doubled again.

Since the turn of the 21st century, West Hoxton has boasted a substantial share of its population born overseas, from a wide range of countries, which indicates that this area had a relatively multicultural population. Amongst those who were born overseas, it featured a notably higher percentage of the population born in non-English-speaking countries compared to those born in mainly English-speaking countries. The overseas-born population in West Hoxton includes those from Europe, as well as from more recent arrivals from Asia and the Pacific. West Hoxton has a higher share of the population born in the Philippines, Fiji and Italy compared to the rest of the City of Liverpool.

Notable residents
 Wendy Paramor (1938–1975), painter and sculptor

Transport
West Hoxton lies to the west of Cowpastures Road which provides connection to other roads leading to Liverpool and Camden. Interline Bus Services provides four bus services routes 851, 852, 853 and 854, running along Cowpastures Road, connecting West Hoxton to Liverpool.

References

Suburbs of Sydney
City of Liverpool (New South Wales)